Chuck Mosley, born Charles Henry Mosley III (December 26, 1959 – November 9, 2017), was an American musician, singer and songwriter. During his career, he recorded over 100 songs, both as a solo artist and as a member of Faith No More, Cement, and Primitive Race.

Mosley began his career in Los Angeles, performing in local bands The Animated and Haircuts That Kill, before joining Faith No More in 1983. He appeared on two albums with the group, We Care a Lot (1985) and follow-up Introduce Yourself (1987), before being fired for "erratic behaviour" the following year. Mosley's last recording for the band was "New Improved Song", released as a covermount for Sounds magazine that same year; the song was later reworked as "The Morning After" for the band's next album The Real Thing.

After Faith No More, Mosley briefly joined the group Bad Brains, before moving on to form Cement. The latter group released two albums—Cement and The Man with the Action Hair—before a bus accident, which left Mosley with a broken back, curtailed their career. Following this, Mosley left the music industry for several years before returning in 2009 with his solo debut, Will Rap Over Hard Rock for Food.  Mosley joined the musical supergroup Primitive Race for their album Soul Pretender, which was released a week before his death; the material on this album was later reworked for the posthumous remix album Cranial Matter. Towards the end of his life, Mosley focussed on acoustic performances, some of which saw release as the 2019 Record Store Day exclusive Joe Haze Sessions #2. According to a statement released by his family, Mosley died "due to the disease of addiction" on November 9, 2017, at age 57.

Mosley is known for his distinctive vocal style—described as "an acquired taste to most"—which blended elements of rap music, punk, and metal, and which has been seen as an influence on popular music of the 1990s. Mosley credited the development of this style to his initial confusion with Faith No More's music, stating, "I hadn't heard anything like it before […] that's where the rapping stuff came from. I couldn't really understand the music. It was complicated and different to me, so I was just screaming to the beat, like ranting".

Songs

Notes

References 

Bibliography

Album notes

 
Lists of songs recorded by American artists